Caldimicrobium is a genus of bacteria from the family of Thermodesulfobacteriaceae. 

Caldimicrobium is an anaerobic thermophile which is roughly 1.0–1.2 micrometers long and 0.5 micrometers wide.

References

Further reading 
 
 

 

Thermodesulfobacteriota
Bacteria genera